The Little Orme is  in height, and is a HuMP (having a minimum Hundred Metre Prominence). It is one of two headlands situated at either end of Llandudno Bay, in Conwy County Borough, Wales. The other, larger, headland is the Great Orme. It has two summits, the higher with a trig point.

Uses
Unlike the Great Orme, the Little Orme has not been developed for copper mining or tourism. There has been limestone quarrying since the mid-19th century on the Penrhyn Bay side, where the Little Ormes Head Quarry tramway was situated. It was centred on Porth Dyniewyd and served by its own narrow gauge railway, but quarrying ceased in 1936. There is some farming on the lower slopes.

The cliffs are a popular challenge for highly experienced rock climbers. The Coast Guard Rescue Unit use the Little Orme for training. Otherwise, it is a popular sightseeing location and walking/hiking site.

Ecology and environment
Parts of the Little Orme (notably the NWWT's Rhiwledyn Nature Reserve) are a Site of Special Scientific Interest. The North Wales Bird Trust is located on its lower slopes, and the Little Orme is a warden-patrolled sanctuary for sea birds.  Bird viewing around the cliffs can be facilitated by trips using small boats. Seals can be seen at what is locally called Angel Bay.

The North Wales Path runs across the Little Orme, using the several public footpaths on its summit.

History
The Little Orme was inhabited during the Mesolithic and Neolithic eras, notably the Pant y Wennol cave.

A small hoard of Iron Age Celtic metalwork was found in a cave on the Little Orme.

The medieval chapel of Blessed Mary of Penrhyn, abandoned in 1930 and now in ruins, is at the foot of the Little Orme in the grounds of Penrhyn Hall at Penrhyn Bay.

On 14 April 1587, printing material for Catholic literature was found in a cave on the Little Orme, where it had been used by the recusant Robert Pugh (squire of Penrhyn Hall) and his Chaplain Father William Davies to print Y Drych Cristianogawl (The Christian Mirror), the first book to be printed in Wales. They had taken refuge there during the persecution of Catholics instigated by Queen Elizabeth I in May 1586.

The Royal Artillery coastal gunnery school, 198 battery, was posted to Little Orme during the Second World War. Target practice was undertaken from the headland to anchored boats, and unspent ammunition and unexploded shells may still be encountered offshore. Gun emplacements and ancillary buildings were in situ until at least the early 1960s, but the site has since been 'landscaped'.

References

Ivor Wynne Jones. Llandudno Queen of Welsh Resorts Landmark, Ashbourne Derbyshire 2002

External links
 North Wales Wildlife Trust: Rhiwledyn (nature reserve official WWW page)
 www.geograph.co.uk : photos of Little Orme and surrounding area

Llandudno
Birdwatching sites in Wales
Headlands of Conwy County Borough